The narrownose chimaera (Harriotta raleighana) is a longnose chimaera of the family Rhinochimaeridae, the longnose chimaeras, consisting of eight species belonging three genera. This species is found in temperate seas worldwide, at depths between 200 and 2,600 m.  Its length is between 1.0 and 1.5 m, including a long, tapering snout and a long, filamentous tail.

Taxonomy 
This species was first described by George Brown Goode and Tarleton Hoffman Bean in 1895. The genus Harriotta refers to Thomas Harriot and the species name references Sir Walter Raleigh.

Description 
Narrownose chimaeras have elongate rostra, slender tails, large pectoral and pelvic fins, large eyes, and two dorsal fins, the first being preceded by a spine. They possess two pairs of non-replaceable tooth plates in the upper jaw and a one pair in the lower jaw. Male H. raleighana are estimated to reach 62.8 cm and female 75.8 cm at maturity, respectively.

Habitat 
The narrownose chimaera is found off Nova Scotia and in much of the rest of the Atlantic Ocean, and in parts of the Pacific Ocean to depths of 3100 metres. Very little is known of their biology due to their deep water habitats.

Reproduction 
Longnose chimaeras are members of the class Chondrichthyes, diverging from their closest relatives (sharks, rays, and skates) approximately 400 million years ago. Like many other Chondrichthyes, longnose chimaeras reproduce by laying eggs. Egg cases consist of a central chamber surrounded by a web-like structure. Female longnose chimaeras lay a pair of eggs several times per season.

Conservation status 
The IUCN has classified this species as being of least concern. In June 2018 the New Zealand Department of Conservation classified the narrownose chimaera as "Not Threatened" under the New Zealand Threat Classification System.

References

narrownose chimaera
Fish of East Asia
Marine fauna of West Africa
Fish of the Western United States
Fish of Brazil
Fish of Iceland
Fauna of the British Isles
Taxa named by Tarleton Hoffman Bean
Taxa named by George Brown Goode
narrownose chimaera